Antoni Gołaś (29 December 1919 – 18 July 2003) was a Polish wrestler. He competed in the men's Greco-Roman welterweight at the 1952 Summer Olympics.

References

External links
 

1919 births
2003 deaths
Polish male sport wrestlers
Olympic wrestlers of Poland
Wrestlers at the 1952 Summer Olympics
People from Rawicz County
Sportspeople from Greater Poland Voivodeship